Dirani is an Arabic surname and a subtribe of the Dombki Baloch tribe in Pakistan. Notable people with the surname include: 

Ali Dirani, Lebanese artist and musician
Claudio Dirani, drummer for Italian pop band Modà  
Danilo Dirani, Brazilian race car driver
Firass Dirani, Australian actor
Hamza Dirani, Jordanian race car and kart driver
Mustafa Dirani, Lebanese security head of the Amal Movement
Zade Dirani, Jordanian and American composer and pianist
Zeinab Dirani, wife of Sheikh Mohamad Osseiran, the Jaafari mufti of Sidon and Zahrani districts of South Lebanon

Pakistani names
Pashto-language surnames